The 2002–03 SM-liiga season was the 28th season of the SM-liiga, the top level of ice hockey in Finland. 13 teams participated in the league, and Tappara Tampere won the championship.

Regular season

Playoffs

Quarterfinals
 HPK - TPS 4:3 (1:2, 3:1, 2:3 P, 0:4, 3:1, 7:0, 6:1)
 Jokerit - HIFK 4:0 (2:1, 4:2, 5:2, 4:1)
 Kärpät - JYP 4:3 (2:5, 4:1, 2:3 P, 2:4, 6:2, 4:1, 3:1)
 Blues - Tappara 3:4 (4:1, 4:2, 2:3 P, 1:4, 4:3 P, 0:2, 1:2 P)

Semifinals
 HPK - Tappara 2:3 (3:2 P, 1:2, 3:2 P, 1:2 P, 2:4)
 Jokerit - Kärpät 2:3 (1:0, 2:4, 3:0, 1:2, 0:2)

3rd place
 HPK - Jokerit 3:0

Final
 Kärpät - Tappara 0:3 (2:3 P, 0:3, 3:4 P)

External links
 SM-liiga official website

1
Finnish
Liiga seasons